Acocks Green railway station (previously known as Acocks Green & South Yardley) serves the Acocks Green area of Birmingham, in the West Midlands region of England.  Pre-nationalisation a GWR station on their main line from London (Paddington) to Birkenhead (Woodside) the station is now served by West Midlands Railway, who manage the station, and by Chiltern Railways.

History
Acocks Green was built to connect the local community to the industrialised areas of the city. Although the station never had a goods yard, Acocks Green boasted 4 platforms, and a loop line on the northbound slow line. British Rail rationalisation led to the removal of the slow lines (and loop) in both directions and the demolition of one island platform to allow for the construction of the current car park.

Services

References

External links
 Photographs of Acocks Green station at warwickshirerailways.com
Rail Around Birmingham and the West Midlands: Acocks Green station
Network West Midlands station page 
 Station on navigable O.S. map

Railway stations in Birmingham, West Midlands
DfT Category E stations
Former Great Western Railway stations
Railway stations in Great Britain opened in 1852
Railway stations served by Chiltern Railways
Railway stations served by West Midlands Trains
1852 establishments in England